The X 2015 Oceania Badminton Championships was the 10th tournament of the Oceania Badminton Championships. It was held in North Harbour, New Zealand from 12 to 15 February 2015.

Venue
X-TRM North Harbour Badminton Centre in North Harbour, New Zealand.

Medalists

Individual event
The table below gives an overview of the individual event medal winners at the 2015 Oceania Championships.

References

External links
 Individual Results

Oceania Badminton Championships
Oceania Badminton Championships
Oceania Badminton Championships
Oceania Badminton Championships
International sports competitions hosted by New Zealand